Yubileyny is a rural locality (a settlement) in Shchetinsky Selsoviet Rural Settlement, Kursky District, Kursk Oblast, Russia. Population:

Geography 
The settlement is located 98 km from the Russia–Ukraine border, at the north-eastern border of the district center – the town Kursk, 2 km from the selsoviet center – Shchetinka.

 Streets
There are the following streets in the locality: Aviatsionnaya, Ilyicha, Kurskaya, Molodyozhnaya, Molodyozhnaya Vtoraya, Molodyozhnaya Tretya, Rossyskaya, Tsvetochnaya and Tsvetochnaya Vtoraya (525 houses).

 Climate
Yubileyny has a warm-summer humid continental climate (Dfb in the Köppen climate classification).

Transport 
Yubileyny is located 5 km from the federal route  (Kursk – Voronezh –  "Kaspy" Highway; a part of the European route ), 1.5 km from the road of regional importance  (Kursk – Ponyri), on the road  (Kursk – Kastornoye), in the vicinity of the railway halt 4 km (railway line Kursk – 146 km).

The rural locality is situated 2.5 km from Kursk Vostochny Airport, 125 km from Belgorod International Airport and 204 km from Voronezh Peter the Great Airport.

References

Notes

Sources

Rural localities in Kursky District, Kursk Oblast